Peta Verco (née Peta Cook; born 2 March 1956) is a former women's cricketer for Australia whose international playing career ran from 1977 until 1985. A right-handed batter, Verco scored a century in Test cricket.

References

External links

 Peta Verco at southernstars.org.au

1956 births
Australia women Test cricketers
Australia women One Day International cricketers
Living people
Cricketers from Western Australia
People from Moora, Western Australia
Western Australia women cricketers